Oneida County Courthouse in Malad, Idaho is an Art Deco building built as a Works Project Administration (WPA) project in 1939.  It serves Oneida County, Idaho.  It was listed on the National Register of Historic Places in 1987.

It was designed by architects Sundberg & Sundberg, who also designed the Jefferson County Courthouse in Rigby and the Jerome County Courthouse in Jerome for WPA construction in 1938.

The courthouse replaced an 1882 Italianate courthouse.

References

Courthouses on the National Register of Historic Places in Idaho
Government buildings completed in 1939
County courthouses in Idaho
Art Deco architecture in Idaho
Buildings and structures in Oneida County, Idaho
National Register of Historic Places in Oneida County, Idaho